In enzymology, a 2,5-didehydrogluconate reductase is an enzyme that catalyzes the chemical reaction

2-dehydro-D-gluconate + NADP+  2,5-didehydro-D-gluconate + NADPH + H+

Thus, the two substrates of this enzyme are 2-dehydro-D-gluconate and NADP+, whereas its 3 products are 2,5-didehydro-D-gluconate, NADPH, and H+.

This enzyme belongs to the family of oxidoreductases, specifically those acting on the CH-OH group of donor with NAD+ or NADP+ as acceptor. The systematic name of this enzyme class is 2-dehydro-D-gluconate:NADP+ 2-oxidoreductase. Other names in common use include 2,5-diketo-D-gluconate reductase, and YqhE reductase.

Structural studies
As of late 2007, only one structure has been solved for this class of enzymes, with the PDB accession code .

References

 
 
 

EC 1.1.1
NADPH-dependent enzymes
Enzymes of known structure